Mime Glacier is a small glacier at the south (upper) end of Tiw Valley in the Asgard Range of Victoria Land, Antarctica. The name is one in a group given by the New Zealand Antarctic Place-Names Committee from Norse mythology. In Der Ring des Nibelungen, Mime is the smith who aids Siegfried to win the ring and is slain by the hero for his treachery.

References

Glaciers of the Asgard Range
McMurdo Dry Valleys